The 2015–16 LEB Plata season will be the 16th season of the Spanish basketball third league LEB Plata. The season will start on October 3 and will end on May 27, 29 or 31 with the last game of the promotion playoffs finals.

Teams

Promotion and relegation (pre-season)
Despite the aim of the Spanish Basketball Federation to increase the number of teams to 16, only a total of 15 teams.

Despite being relegated to Liga EBA, Sáenz Horeca Araberri achieved a vacant berth like CB Ciudad de Valladolid and Fundación Lucentum Baloncesto, two new-creation teams. Instituto de Fertilidad Clínicas Rincón resigned to its place in LEB Oro and decided to join the league.

Team relegated from the 2014–15 LEB Oro
CB Prat Joventut (remained in LEB Oro achieving a vacant berth)
Teams promoted from the 2014–15 Liga EBA
Aceitunas Fragata Morón
CB Andratx Giwine (resigned to promote)
CB Deportivo Coín (resigned to promote)
Covirán Granada

Venues and locations

Regular season

League table

Copa LEB Plata
At the half of the league, the two first teams in the table play the Copa LEB Plata at home of the winner of the first half season (13th round). If this team doesn't want to host the Copa Princesa, the second qualified can do it. If nobody wants to host it, the Federation will propose a neutral venue.

The Champion of this Cup will play the play-offs as first qualified if it finishes the league between the 2nd and the 5th qualified. The Copa Princesa will be played on January 29, 2016.

The game

Playoffs

Stats leaders in regular season

Points

Rebounds

Assists

Performance Index Rating

Awards

MVP
 Javonte Green (Marín Ence Peixegalego)

Coach of the year
 Javi Llorente (Marín Ence Peixegalego)

All-LEB Plata Team
PG  Carles Marzo (Carrefour "El Bulevar" de Ávila)
SG  Gabe Rogers (Marín Ence Peixegalego)
SF  Javonte Green (Marín Ence Peixegalego)
PF  Beau Levesque (Sáenz Horeca Araberri)
C  Aleksandar Marciuš (Sammic ISB)
Source:

References and notes

External links
Official website

LEB Plata seasons
LEB3